A key-sequenced data set (KSDS) is a type of data set used by IBM's VSAM computer data storage system. Each record in a KSDS data file is embedded with a unique key. A KSDS consists of two parts, the data component and a separate index file known as the index component which allows the system to physically locate the record in the data file by its key value. Together, the data and index components are called a cluster.

Records can be accessed randomly or in sequence and can be variable-length.

As a VSAM data set, the KSDS data and index components consist of control intervals which are further organized in control areas. As records are added at random to a KSDS, control intervals fill and need to be split into two new control intervals, each new control interval receiving roughly half of the records. Similarly, as the control intervals in a control area are used up, a control area will be split into two new control areas, each new control area receiving roughly half the control intervals.

While a basic KSDS only has one key (the primary key), alternate indices may be defined to permit the use of additional fields as secondary keys. An alternate index is itself a KSDS.

See also
Entry Sequenced Data Set
Linear Data Set
Relative Record Data Set

External links
Lascon.co.uk
Redbooks.ibm.com

References

Computer file systems